The Harting Old Club is a British friendly society, originating in the village of South Harting, West Sussex, and dating back to at least 1800, but in probability at least another 75 years before that. Every Whit Monday the members parade outside St Gabriel's church at 11 o'clock where the secretary calls the roll. The club members then march up and down the high street to the accompaniment of a brass band. In their hand they carry a hazel wand, and on their lapel they wear a red, blue and white rosette. Following a short service the (all male) members retire to enjoy a feast.

References
Footnotes

Notes

Bibliography

External links

Festivities Web-Site

Clubs and societies in West Sussex
Friendly societies of the United Kingdom